The Monmouth Hawks football program is the intercollegiate American football team for the Monmouth University located in the U.S. state of New Jersey. As of the upcoming 2022 season, the Hawks compete in the NCAA Division I Football Championship Subdivision (FCS) as a member of the Colonial Athletic Association (CAA). The school's first football team was fielded in 1993. The team plays its home games at the 4,200 seat Kessler Field. They are coached by Kevin Callahan.

Championships

Conference

† Co-champions

Division I-AA/FCS playoffs
The Hawks have made three appearances in the FCS playoffs. Their record is 1–3.

Notable former players

To date, six Monmouth Hawks alumni have played in the National Football League (NFL). In addition to the NFL, Monmouth alumni have played professionally for the Canadian Football League (CFL) and the Arena Football League (AFL).

Former wide receiver Miles Austin was the first player from Monmouth to appear in the NFL and played in the league for 10 seasons, primarily with the Dallas Cowboys.

NFL players
 Miles Austin
 Jose Gumbs
 Chris Hogan
 John Nalbone
 Neal Sterling
 Hakeem Valles

CFL players
 Tevrin Brandon
 Reggie White Jr.

AFL players
 Brian Brikowski
 Will Holder

References

External links
 

 
American football teams established in 1993
1993 establishments in New Jersey